Athlone is an unincorporated community in Merced County, California, US.

A post office was operated in Athlone from 1881 to 1905, with a closure during part of 1901, from 1906 to 1909, and from 1914 to 1937.

Athlone was named after the Irish town of the same name, in County Westmeath Ireland. Early settlers was Lee R. and George Francher. Athlone was laid out and roads built  in 1874.

The US Army built the Athlone Auxiliary Field (1942-1945) to train World War II pilots in Athlone.

References

Unincorporated communities in Merced County, California
Unincorporated communities in California